Warren Bradley may refer to:

 Warren Bradley (footballer) (1933–2007), English footballer
 Warren Bradley (politician), former leader of Liverpool City Council
 Warren Ives Bradley (1847–1868), American author who wrote as Glance Gaylord